Shannon G. Hardin (born April 7, 1987) is the President of the Columbus, Ohio City Council.

Hardin is a Columbus native, and attended Columbus Africentric K-8 and Columbus Alternative High School before attending Morehouse College in Atlanta. After college, Hardin served as the External Affairs Manager, LGBTQ liaison, and was on the Religious Advisory Commission for the Office of then-Columbus Mayor Michael B. Coleman. Hardin was appointed to Columbus City Council on October 7, 2014 to fill the vacancy created by the resignation of Troy Miller. On November 3, 2015, he won election to fill the remainder of the unexpired term.

Since January 2018, Hardin has served as President of Columbus City Council. In that capacity, he serves as the head of the legislative branch of the City of Columbus. Additionally, Hardin serves as the Chair of Rules Committee and the Small and Minority Business Committee.

Hardin is openly gay; a first for a Columbus City Council president. He and his husband Ben Zachrich live with their son Noah and two pets, Teddy and Bella.

Electoral history

References

External links
 

Politicians from Columbus, Ohio
Columbus City Council members
Ohio Democrats
21st-century American politicians
1987 births
Living people
Morehouse College alumni
African-American people in Ohio politics
American LGBT city council members
LGBT people from Ohio
21st-century African-American politicians
20th-century African-American people